Bennett may refer to:

People
Bennett (name), including a list of people with the surname and given name
Bennett (Musician), Pop R&B Artist

Places

Canada
Bennett, Alberta
Bennett, British Columbia
Bennett Lake, in the British Columbia and Yukon Territory
Bennett Range
Bennett Lake Volcanic Complex

United States
Bennett, Colorado
Bennett, Iowa
Bennett, Missouri
Bennett, North Carolina
Bennett, West Virginia
Bennett, Wisconsin, a town
Bennett (community), Wisconsin, an unincorporated community
Bennett County, South Dakota
Bennett Mountain, in the Sonoma Mountains, California
Bennett Valley 
Bennett Township (disambiguation)

Elsewhere
Bennett Island, in the East Siberian Sea
Bennett Islands, Antarctica

Education
Bennett College, in Greensboro, North Carolina,U.S.
Bennett College (New York), U.S.
Bennett High School (disambiguation)
Bennett Middle School, Salisbury, Maryland, U.S.
Bennett Memorial Diocesan School, Tunbridge Wells, Kent, England
Bennett University, Greater Noida, Uttar Pradesh, India

See also

Benet (disambiguation)
Benett
Bennet (disambiguation)
Bennett Creek (disambiguation)
Justice Bennett (disambiguation)
Lake Bennett (disambiguation)